Cyril Gaillard (born 20 January 1986 in Grenoble) is a French cross-country skier. He competed for France at the 2014 Winter Olympics.

References

External links 
 
 
 
 

1986 births
Living people
French male cross-country skiers
Olympic cross-country skiers of France
Cross-country skiers at the 2014 Winter Olympics
Sportspeople from Grenoble